General elections were held in Thailand on 6 February 2005. The result was a landslide victory for the Thai Rak Thai party of Prime Minister Thaksin Shinawatra, which won 377 of the 500 seats in the House of Representatives, with its former coalition partner, the Chart Thai Party taking 25 seats. The opposition Democrat Party of Thailand won only 96 seats and the newly formed Mahachon Party took two seats.

Background
Following the 2001 general elections, the New Aspiration Party merged into Thai Rak Thai, although it the NAP was later re-established by Chingchai Mongkoltham. The National Development Party (Thailand) and Liberal Democratic Party also merged with Thai Rak Thai Party.

Electoral system
At the time, the House of Representatives consisted of 400 members elected from single-member constituencies and 100 members elected from national party lists on a proportional basis.

Campaign

Democrat Party

The Democrat Party, led by Banyat Bantadtan, did not seriously expect to defeat the coalition of the other two parties, but hoped to win 200 seats, which would have been a gain of 70 seats. However, intra-party conflicts between Banyat's southern faction and the Bangkok faction led by Abhisit Vejjajiva made this goal appear even less realistic.  The Democrats also developed a populist agenda, promising more jobs, free education and health care, and combating crime and corruption. However, the party refused to give details of their policies.

The TRT's landslide victory cast doubt over the future of both party leaders, and Banyat resigned as Democrat Party leader immediately after the election. Abhisit Vejjajiva, Banyat's successor, said: "It will take a long time to revive the party because we need to look four years ahead and consider how to stay in the hearts of the people."

Thai Rak Thai
The Thai Rak Thai party was seeking to win an absolute majority in its own right, something no political party had ever achieved in Thailand at a genuinely free election. A coalition of other parties and civil society groups was formed to prevent this, arguing that Thaksin already had too much power and that giving him an absolute parliamentary majority would encourage what they alleged were his authoritarian tendencies. Prominent academic Kasem Sirisamphan, for example, accused Thaksin of running a "parliamentary dictatorship" and said that "people do not want a billionaire prime minister to further dominate the country and its politics."

Thaksin's party replied that it had provided Thailand with a stable, competent and corruption-free government, although critics said that corruption has actually increased under Thaksin's watch. Party spokesperson Suranand Vejjajiva said that Thais Love Thais was "the first party which could translate its populist policies into action. Its achievements and Mr Thaksin's vision give the party a clear edge and it will win an absolute majority," he said.

Thai politics tend to be regionally based. Thai Rak Thai is strongest in the north-east region (Isan), the poorest and most populated part of the country, where Thaksin's populist policies are most popular. TRT is also dominant in the north, since Thaksin was born in Chiang Mai and has directed much government spending to his home region. Thai Rak Thai is strong in the Chao Phraya valley as well, although the region has historically been a stronghold of Chart Thai, which still dominates in some of the central provinces. Voters in Bangkok, the wealthiest part of the country, are less predictable, but steady economic growth, goal-oriented campaign agendas like "Healthy Bangkok" and "10 new MRT lines across the capital", and the publicity Thaksin received after the 2004 Indian Ocean earthquake was enough to swing the allegiance of the capital's middle-class to TRT. The Democrats are strongest in the south, but are popular among liberal-minded voters in Bangkok.

During 2004 most observers suggested that Thaksin's popularity had declined since its peak in 2003, and that he was unlikely to achieve an absolute majority for his own party. The deaths of Muslim protesters in southern Thailand and the bird flu outbreak were seen as issues which the Thaksin government had handled poorly.

Tsunami effects
These calculations were upset by the disaster of the 2004 Indian Ocean earthquake, which devastated six southern coastal provinces. The tsunami and its aftermath drove the election campaign to a large extent out of the media, and also produced a strong sense of national solidarity, from both of which an incumbent government could be expected to benefit. Most commentators praised the Thaksin government's response to the disaster. Political commentator Veera Prateepchaikul, who identified himself as an opponent of Thaksin, wrote in the Bangkok Post on 10 January: "Mr Thaksin deserves credit for his quick response to the disaster, his decisive leadership and his skills in crisis management."

Veera also pointed out that the provinces directly affected by the tsunami were part of the Democrat Party's southern stronghold, and that Thaksin's high profile, particularly on state television, in delivering aid to the area might improve his party's chances of winning more seats in the south. "The Democrats might cry foul that Mr Thaksin is using the state media for campaign purposes," Veera wrote, "but the people may think otherwise." Only a miracle, he wrote, could turn the "tsunami tide which is now clearly in favour of Mr Thaksin." In the event the Democrats retained their dominance in southern Thailand, winning 50 of the 52 southern seats for which figures are available.

Pre-election predictions
Given such increased expectations, a failure by Thai Rak Thai to win 250 seats would have been seen as a considerable setback for Thaksin. The Bangkok newspaper The Nation published predictions by its reporters on 8 January, predicting that of the 400 constituency seats, Thai Rak Thai would win 233, the Democrats 94, Chart Thai 47 and Great People 26. If the parties achieved similar results in the 100 proportionate seats, this would have given Thais Love Thais about 290 seats overall and the Democrats about 120 seats. This proved to be a considerable underestimate of the scale of Thaksin's victory.

Results
Thaksin's party dominated most of Thailand's regions. In Bangkok it won 32 seats to the Democrats' four and Chart Thai's one. In the Central region it won 79 seats, to 10 for Chart Thai and eight for the Democrats. In the North, it won 71 seats to the Democrats' five. In the North-East (Isan) region, it won a massive 126 seats, to the Chart Thai's six, with two each going to the Democrats' and the Mahachon Party. Only in the South was the landslide resisted. Democrats won 52 seats in their traditional stronghold, while Chart Thai and Thai Rak Thai won only one seat each.  Of the 100 seats elected by proportional representation, Thais Love Thais won 67, to the Democrats' 26 and Chart Thai's seven.

Thaksin said he would now form a one-party administration, ending his uneasy coalition with Chart Thai. The Bangkok newspaper The Nation said that Thaksin "has apparently won the strongest popular re-endorsement in Thai political history and is set to be the most powerful prime minister ever elected to lead the Kingdom." Thaksin is the first democratically elected Prime Minister of Thailand to complete a full four-year term in office and the first to win an absolute majority in the House in a relatively free election.

The day after the election, Thaksin said he would "work harder and faster to implement policies and resolve the country's problems." He said the government would "quickly boost Thailand's competitiveness in the international market, and would also look into improving religious affairs issues." This was taken as a reference to the situation in the south of the country, which has a large Muslim population, where there has been a history of unrest and disturbances, and where Thaksin's party won only one seat. The Nation newspaper reported: "Many voters [in the south] said they had lost faith in Thaksin, who has refused to apologise for incidents such as the deaths of 78 Muslims in October who were held in military custody after being arrested for protesting in the village of Tak Bai."

Results by province

References 

"Rivals battle to end Thaksin era," Bangkok Post, 6 January 2005
Veera Prateepchaikul, "Thaksin is swept along by the tsunami," ''Bangkok Post, 10 January 2005

Literature

External links
Elections under Thaksin - a rural perspective
Angus Reid Consultants - Election Tracker
The Nation's guide to the general election
Realtime vote-counting report
News about Thailand's 2005 General Election
Why Thaksin succeeds

Elections in Thailand
Thailand
General
General